Dunblane Cathedral is the larger of the two Church of Scotland parish churches serving Dunblane, near the city of Stirling, in central Scotland.

The lower half of the tower is pre-Romanesque from the 11th century, and was originally free-standing, with an upper part added in the 15th century. Most of the rest of the building is Gothic, from the 13th century. The building was restored by Rowand Anderson from 1889 to 1893.

History
The church is dedicated to the 6th century saint, St Blane, and this gives its name to the settlement: dunblane meaning hill of St Blane. The church also had an altar to St Laurence. The oldest surviving part of the church is the lower four storeys of the tower which date from around 1100AD. The upper two storeys of the tower date from around 1500.

The cathedral was once the seat of the bishops of Dunblane (also sometimes called 'of Strathearn'), until the abolition of bishops after the Glorious Revolution in 1689. There are remains of the vaults of the episcopal palace to the south of the cathedral. Technically, it is no longer a cathedral, as there are no bishops in the Church of Scotland, which is a Presbyterian denomination. After the abolition of prelacy, the choir became the parish church but the nave fell out of use, and its roof had fallen in by about 1600.

It contains the graves of Margaret Drummond of Stobhall, a mistress of King James IV of Scotland and her two sisters, all said to have been poisoned.

Unusually, the building is owned by the Crown, and is looked after by Historic Scotland rather than the church governance; there is no entrance charge.

The building is largely 13th century in date, though it incorporates an originally freestanding bell-tower (like the example at Muthill) of 11th century date on its south side. This tower was increased in height in the 15th century, a change clearly visible in the colour of the stonework, and in the late Gothic style of the upper storey's windows.

The choir dates from the 13th century and has a long vaulted chamber which served as chapter house and sacristy on its north side. The choir contains the mural tomb of the cathedral's founder, Bishop Clement. Many of the 15th century choir stalls, which have carved misericords (including one with an unusual depiction of a bat) are preserved within the choir. Further, more elaborate, canopied stalls are preserved at the west end of the nave. Dunblane has the largest surviving collection of medieval Scottish ecclesiastical woodwork after King's College Chapel, Aberdeen. Some detached fragments are displayed in the town's museum.

The cathedral was restored in the late 19th century under the control of Rev Alexander Ritchie DD, who commissioned architect Robert Rowand Anderson to oversee the works, with these works completed by Sir Robert Lorimer in 1912.

Stained Glass

West window - Tree of Jesse by Clayton and Bell placed 1906 by Robert Younger, Baron Blanesburgh
Baptismal window (over font) John the Baptist in the River Jordan, by Douglas Strachan 1926
Window over south-west door, St George and Hope by Louis Davis 1915 in memory of Col. J Boyd Wilson, a church elder
The Barty window, the Song of Solomon by Louis Davis erected 1917
The Apostles (south-east corner) in memory of Mr and Mrs Wallace of Glassingall
John the Baptist and the Good Shepherd (south-east corner) in memory of Rev Dr Henry M Hamilton c.1905
Main East Window (choir), the Life of Christ by Charles Eamer Kempe 1901 in memory of John Alexander Hay
South window (choir) Three Holy Children from the Book of Daniel by Louis Davis presented by Robert Younger, Baron Blanesburgh
Allegory window (choir), four angels, four directions
Chaos window (choir), a curiosity representing Scott's tragic journey to the South Pole and naming the five men killed
The Earth window (choir)
The Humanity window (choir) Adam and Eve with Cain and Abel
Memorial window (Lady Chapel) St Blane and a Crusader, Bishop Maurice and a WWI soldier, by Douglas Strachan c, 1922
The Lord's Supper (Lady Chapel) by Douglas Strachan c.1922
The Healing of the Sick (Lady Chapel) by Douglas Strachan c.1922
The Transfiguration (Lady Chapel) by Gordon Webster c.1922
Christ justifying harvesting on the Sabbath (Lady Chapel) by Gordon Webster
Christ on the Sea of Galilee (Lady Chapel) by Gordon Webster
Ruskin window (over west door) only visible from outside

Burials
Preserved within the arcaded nave are two early Christian stones, a cross-slab and a possible architectural frieze, survivals from an early medieval church on the same site, founded by or dedicated to the 'Blane' whose name is commemorated in the name of the town.

Dunblane Cathedral churchyard contains two war graves, including that of William Stirling, a gunner in the Royal Marine Artillery during World War I.

Monuments of interest
Bishop Clement of Dunblane (d.1258)
Malise II, Earl of Strathearn (d.1271)
The Three Drummond Sisters, poisoned, 16th century
Rev James Finlayson DD (1758-1808)
Sir David Russell (1809-1884)
James Stirling (mathematician) (1690-1770) and the Stirlings of Garden
John Stirling of Kippendavie (d.1812) by Peter Turnerelli
Jane Stirling (1804-1859) daughter of the above

Dunblane Commemoration
In the nave of the cathedral is a standing stone by the monumental sculptor Richard Kindersley which commemorates the events of 13 March 1996 – the Dunblane Massacre. The quotations on the stone are by E. V. Rieu ("He called a little child to him..."), Richard Henry Stoddard ("...the spirit of a little child"), Bayard Taylor ("But still I dream that somewhere there must be The spirit of a child that waits for me") and W. H. Auden ("We are linked as children in a circle dancing").

Other churches in Dunblane
Dunblane Cathedral is one of at least seven churches in the town. The others are St Blane's (another Church of Scotland congregation, named after the town's founder), St Mary's (a Scottish Episcopal Church congregation), the Roman Catholic Church dedicated to the Holy Family, the Quaker Meeting House, the (independent Evangelical) Dunblane Christian Fellowship, and the Eastern Orthodox parish dedicated to Saint Nicholas; unusually, this Orthodox community is Old Calendarist and thus comes directly under the authority of the Ecumenical Patriarchate rather than the nearest Orthodox bishop.

Gallery

Notable people and events
Ministers and clergy
Michael Potter (minister) 1692
The Very Rev James Cockburn, Moderator of the General Assembly of the Church of Scotland (1941–42)
The Very Rev John Rodger Gray, Moderator of the General Assembly of the Church of Scotland (1977–78) (father of James Gray MP)

Burials
Malise II, Mormaer of Strathearn
Margaret Drummond, mistress of James IV of Scotland
James Finlayson, Church of Scotland minister and writer
Jane Stirling, pianist

Weddings
In April 2015, tennis player and Dunblane native Andy Murray returned to his hometown to marry his long-term partner Kim Sears in a private service at the cathedral.

See also
List of Church of Scotland parishes

References

External links

Dunblane Cathedral

Dunblane Cathedral Arts Guild
Engraving of Dunblane Cathedral by James Fittler in the digitised copy of Scotia Depicta, or the antiquities, castles, public buildings, noblemen and gentlemen's seats, cities, towns and picturesque scenery of Scotland, 1804 at National Library of Scotland
 Engraving of Dunblane Cathedral in 1693 by John Slezer at National Library of Scotland

Category A listed buildings in Stirling (council area)
Churches in Stirling (council area)
Scheduled Ancient Monuments in Stirling
Cathedrals of the Church of Scotland
Listed cathedrals in Scotland
Medieval cathedrals in Scotland
Protestant churches converted from Roman Catholicism
Culdees
Romanesque architecture in Scotland
Gothic architecture in Scotland
Listed buildings in Dunblane